Parkinson Peak is a pyramidal peak (690 m) near the coast in the north-central Wilson Hills, Antarctica. It surmounts the north extremity of the ridge complex that is the divide between Tomilin and Noll Glaciers. Visited in March 1961 by an airborne field party from the ANARE (Australian National Antarctic Research Expeditions) (Magga Dan, 1961) led by Phillip Law. Named for W.D. Parkinson, geophysicist with the expedition.

Mountains of Oates Land